Kidsongs is an American children's media franchise that includes Kidsongs Music Video Stories on DVD and video, The Kidsongs TV Show, CDs of favorite children's songs, songbooks, sheet music, toys, and an ecommerce website. It was created by producer/writer Carol Rosenstein and director Bruce Gowers of Together Again Video Productions (TAVP), both of whom are music video and television production veterans. The duo had produced and directed over 100 music videos for Warner Bros. Records (WBR) and took their idea of music videos for children to the record label. Warner Brothers funded the first video, "A Day at Old MacDonald's Farm". Shortly thereafter, a three-way partnership between TAVP, WBR, and View-Master Video, with TAVP responsible for production and WBR and View-Master responsible for distribution to video and music stores, and toy stores respectively.

History
The home video series was launched with four Kidsongs Music Video Stories episodes at New York's Toy Fair on January 1, 1985. "A Day at Old MacDonald's Farm" was one of those first four and has sold over 4 million copies and won the Vira Award. Each half-hour Music Video Stories episode features 10 to 15 songs, in a music video style production starring children. They sing and dance their way through well-known children's songs, nursery rhymes, and covers of pop hits from the '50s, '60s, and '70s—all tied together by a simple story and theme.

The TAVP/WBR/View-Master Video partnership (Viewmaster was acquired by Tyco Toys in 1989–95)  produced 16 Kidsongs episodes of the Music Video Stories. In 1995, WBR and TAVP bought out Tyco's distribution rights and produced three more View-Master videos called "Country Sing-Along", Billy Biggle's Favorite Songs, and "Boppin' with the Biggles" in 1994, and two KidVision videos called "Let's Put on a Show!" & "Baby Animal Songs" in 1995, as part of a new venture with another division of Warner Bros.--Warner Vision. In 1997, TAVP acquired all rights from WBR/Warner Vision and became the sole owner of all Kidsongs properties.

Later in 1997, TAVP entered into a distribution/production agreement with Sony Wonder, which resulted in the production of four more titles called "I Can Dance!", "I Can Do It!", "Adventures in Biggleland: Billy's Birthday" and "Adventures in Biggleland: Meet the Biggles". That agreement ended on July 1, 1998, and in 2002, distribution rights were licensed by RLJE Films, which continues to distribute the videos.

Notable members
Shawn Harrison (1986)
Devyn Puett (1986–1987)
Ryan Bollman (1986)
Raquel Alessi (1989–1990)
Jensen Karp (1989–1990)
Josh Keaton (1989–1990)
Veena Goel (1990)
Danielle Keaton (1992–1995)
Alexandra Picatto (1993–1995)
Galen Hooks (1994)
Lynsey Bartilson (1995)

Home Videos
From September 1, 1985, to August 5, 1999, Kidsongs home video episodes encompassing 300 children's songs, nursery rhymes, and cover versions of pop hits from the '50s to the '90s were produced, featuring a variety of topics that are of interest to kids: animals, birthdays, the zoo, sports, summer camp, fantasy, vehicles, and general silliness. 14 have been certified platinum by the RIAA, with 5 of them having sold more than 2 million copies. As of now, the videos have sold over 19.5 million copies.

The following is a complete list of Kidsongs music video titles available on VHS:

A Day at Old MacDonald's Farm (1985)
Featuring these music videos:
"Old MacDonald Had a Farm"
"Shortenin' Bread" (also plays instrumentally during the intro of I'd Like to Teach the World to Sing)
"Here We Go Round the Mulberry Bush"
"Mary Had a Little Lamb"
"This Old Man"
"Skip to My Lou" (also plays instrumentally during the intro and the end credits of this video and Ride the Roller Coaster)
"Take Me Out to the Ball Game" (includes footage from the 1984 World Series a year before)
"John Jacob Jingleheimer Schmidt"
"She'll Be Comin' Round the Mountain"
"Twinkle, Twinkle, Little Star"

I'd Like to Teach the World to Sing (1986)
Featuring these music videos:
"I'd Like to Teach the World to Sing" (United States) (also used in the final scene and during the end credits)
"Funiculi, Funicula" (Italy)
"Did You Ever See a Lassie?" (Scotland)
"London Bridge" (England)
"Frère Jacques/Are You Sleeping" (France)
"Kumbaya" (Ivory Coast)
"Waltzing Matilda" (Australia)
"Sakura, Sakura" (Japan)
"Los Pollitos" (Mexico)
"Day-O (Banana Boat Song)" (Jamaica)

Good Night, Sleep Tight (1986)
Featuring these music videos:
Playground Medley:
"Ring Around the Rosie"
"Pat-a-Cake"
"A-Tisket, A-Tasket"
"Let Us Dance, Let Us Play" (Michael Lloyd)
"Our House" (Crosby, Stills, Nash & Young)
"Tomorrow is a Dream Away" (Michael Lloyd) (also used during the end credits)
"The Unicorn" (The Irish Rovers)
"St. Judy's Comet" (Paul Simon)
"Hush, Little Baby"
"Lullaby and Good Night" (Johannes Brahms)
"All the Pretty Little Horses"
"Good Night" (The Beatles)

Cars, Boats, Trains and Planes (1986)
Featuring these music videos:
"Car Car Song (Riding in My Car)" (Woody Guthrie)
"Daylight Train (Get on Board, Little Children)"
"Up and Down, Round and Round" (Michael Lloyd)
"Row, Row, Row Your Boat"
"I Got Wheels" (Michael Lloyd) (also used during the end credits)
"Up, Up and Away" (The Fifth Dimension)
"Where, Oh Where Has My Little Dog Gone?" (Septimus Winner)
"I Like Trucks" (Michael Lloyd)
"US Air Force (Wild Blue Yonder)"
"The Bus Song"

Sing Out, America! (1986)
Featuring these music videos:
"Yankee Doodle Dandy"
"America's Heroes" (Michael Lloyd) (also used during the end credits)
"Home on the Range"
"I've Been Working on the Railroad"
"Oh Susanna"
"Deep in the Heart of Texas" (Perry Como)
"There's a Hole in My Bucket"
"Turkey in the Straw"
"If I Had a Hammer" (Trini Lopez)
"You're a Grand Old Flag" (includes footage from NASA)
"Living in the USA" (Chuck Berry)

A Day with the Animals (1986)
Featuring these music videos:
"BINGO"
"Do Your Ears Hang Low?" (also used during the end credits)
"Little Bo Peep"
"Why Don't You Write Me?" (Simon and Garfunkel)
"Rockin' Robin" (Bobby Day)
"Water World" (Michael Lloyd)
"The Wanderer" (Dion DiMucci)
"Harmony" (Michael Lloyd)
Pet Store Medley: 
"How Much is That Doggie in the Window?" (the last portion of the song is used after "The Itsy Bitsy Spider")
"Little Duckie Duddle"
"Hickory Dickory Dock"
"Itsy Bitsy Spider"

What I Want to Be! (1986)
Featuring these music videos:
"What Do You Want to Be?" (Michael Lloyd) (also used during the end credits)
"Sea Cruise" (Frankie Ford)
"Drivin' My Life Away" (Eddie Rabbitt)
School Medley: 
"One, Two, Buckle My Shoe"
"School Days"
"The Alphabet Song"
"I Wanna Be a Fireman" (Michael Lloyd) (also used during the end credits)
"The Candy Man" (Willy Wonka & the Chocolate Factory)
"Them Bones" (also used during the end credits)
"Mr. Policeman" (Michael Lloyd) (also used during the end credits)
"Rodeo Rider" (Michael Lloyd)
"Act Naturally" (Buck Owens)

The Wonderful World of Sports (1987)

Also known by the title "Let's Play Ball."

Featuring these music videos:
"It's Not If You Win or Lose" (Michael Lloyd) (also used during the end credits with extended version)
"Practice Makes Perfect" (Michael Lloyd)
"Bend Me, Shape Me" (The American Breed)
"I Get Around" (The Beach Boys) 
"Over the River and Through the Woods"
"Footloose" (Kenny Loggins)
"Rah, Rah, Sis Boom Bah" (Removed from the British version)
"Catch a Wave" (The Beach Boys)
"Centerfield" (John Fogerty)
"You Know That You Can Do It" (Michael Lloyd)

A Day at the Circus (1987)
Featuring these music videos:
"The Circus Is Coming to Town" (Michael Lloyd) (tune: "The Caissons Go Rolling Along") (also used during the end credits)
"Polly Wolly Doodle"
"Strolling Through the Park"
"The Sabre Dance" (Instrumental) (Aram Khachaturian)
"Put On a Happy Face" (Bye Bye Birdie)
"The Ringmaster Song" (Michael Lloyd)
"The Man on the Flying Trapeze"
"The Lion Tamer" (Michael Lloyd)
"If You're Happy and You Know It"
"Entry of the Gladiators" (Instrumental) (Julius Fučík)

A Day at Camp (1989)
Featuring these music videos:
"The More We Get Together/The More We Play Together" (also used during the end credits)
"The Caissons Go Rolling Along"
"Fishin' Blues" (Taj Mahal)
"On Top of Spaghetti"
Campfire Medley: 
"99 Bottles of Pop"
"Pop Goes the Weasel"
"Found a Peanut"
"The Ants Go Marching"
"Boom, Boom, Ain't It Great to Be Crazy?" 
Animal Medley:
"The Animal Fair"
"Little Bunny Foo Foo"
"Pussycat, Pussycat"
"Baa, Baa, Black Sheep"
"The Old Gray Mare"
"I Had a Little Rooster"
"Whistle While You Work" (Snow White and the Seven Dwarfs)
"The Hokey Pokey"
"When the Saints Go Marching In"

Ride the Roller Coaster (1990)
Featuring these music videos:
"Let's Twist Again" (Chubby Checker)
"Whole Lotta Shakin' Goin' On" (Jerry Lee Lewis)
"Little Deuce Coupe" (The Beach Boys)
"Fast Food" (Michael Lloyd)
"Here We Go Loopty Loo" (Traditional)
"Anything You Can Do" (Annie Get Your Gun)
"Splish Splash" (Bobby Darin)
"A Pirate's Life" (tune: "Sailor's Hornpipe")
"We're Gonna Get Wet" (Michael Lloyd)
"1812 Overture" (Instrumental) (Pyotr Ilyich Tchaikovsky)

Very Silly Songs (1991)
Featuring these music videos:
"The Name Game"
"Down by the Bay"
"Rig-a-Jig-Jig" (also used during the end credits)
"Mail Myself to You" (Woody Guthrie)
"Purple People Eater" (includes footage from concert venue)
"Fiddle-I-Dee" (from Kentucky)
"The Thing" (Phil Harris)
"Jim Along Josie"
"Michael Finnegan"
"Do the Silly Willy" (Michael Lloyd)

A Day of Fun (1991)
Featuring these music videos:
"BINGO" (from A Day with the Animals)
"I Got Wheels" (from Cars, Boats, Trains and Planes)
"Old MacDonald Had a Farm" (from A Day at Old MacDonald's Farm)
"Day-O (Banana Boat Song)" (from I'd Like to Teach the World to Sing)
"The Circus Is Coming to Town" (from A Day at the Circus)
"We're Gonna Get Wet" (from Ride the Roller Coaster)
"Down by the Bay" (from Very Silly Songs)
"Them Bones" (from What I Want to Be!)
"I've Been Working on the Railroad" (from Home on the Range)
"When the Saints Go Marching In" (from A Day at Camp)
"The More We Get Together/The More We Play Together" (from A Day at Camp) (also used during the end credits)

We Wish You a Merry Christmas (1992)
Featuring these music videos:
"Deck the Halls"
"All I Want for Christmas Is My Two Front Teeth"
"Silent Night" (Instrumental underscore)
"Frosty the Snowman"
"Jingle Bells" (also used during the end credits)
"Santa, Please Don't Forget Me" (Michael Lloyd)
"If I Had a Pony for Christmas" (Michael Lloyd)
"The Twelve Days of Christmas"
"Rudolph the Red-Nosed Reindeer"
"Santa Claus is Coming to Town"
"We Wish You a Merry Christmas"

Play Along Songs (1993)
Featuring these music videos:
"Come on and Join in the Game" (Pete Seeger)
"Fooba Wooba John" (Burl Ives)
"Down by the Station"
"Oh, Dear, What Should the Color Be?"
"Bumpin' Up and Down (in My Little Red Wagon)"
"Three Little Fishies"
"And the Green Grass Grows All Around"
"Chickie Chickie Beat"
"Ten in the Bed (Roll Over)"
"Join the Band" (Michael Lloyd) (also used during the end credits)

If We Could Talk to the Animals (1993)
Featuring these music videos:
"Hound Dog" (Elvis Presley)
"If We Could Talk to the Animals" (Doctor Dolittle) (also used during the end credits)
"Five Little Monkeys"
"Raccoon & Possum" (Original)
"Over in the Meadow"
"The Bear Went Over the Mountain"
"The Farmer in the Dell"
"The Kickin' Mule"
"The Old Hen"
"See You Later, Alligator" (Bill Haley and his Comets)

Billy Biggle's Favorite Songs (1994)
Featuring these music videos:
"Down by the Bay" (from Very Silly Songs)
"Jim Along Josie" (from Very Silly Songs)
"Five Little Monkeys" (from If We Could Talk to the Animals) (also used during the end credits)
"BINGO" (from A Day with the Animals)
"Michael Finnegan" (from Very Silly Songs)
"We're Gonna Get Wet" (from Ride the Roller Coaster)
"Take Me Out to the Ball Game" (from A Day at Old MacDonald's Farm)
"Down by the Station" (from Play Along Songs)
"I've Been Working on the Railroad" (from Home on the Range)
"Raccoon & Possum" (from If We Could Talk to the Animals)
"The Farmer in the Dell" (from If We Could Talk to the Animals)
"Old MacDonald Had a Farm" (from A Day at Old MacDonald's Farm)

Country Sing-Along (1994)
Featuring these music videos:
"Swingin'" (John Anderson)
"On the Road Again" (Willie Nelson)
"Watch Our Oats and Barley Grow"
"The Old Chisholm Trail"
"Born to Be a Cowboy" (Michael Lloyd) (also used during the end credits)
"Buffalo Gals"
"Nashville Cats" (The Lovin' Spoonful)
"Achy Breaky Heart" (Billy Ray Cyrus)
"Country Kid" (Michael Lloyd)
"Happy Trails to You"

Boppin' with the Biggles (1994)
Featuring these music videos:
"Walkin' the Dog" (Rufus Thomas)
"Head, Shoulders, Knees and Toes"
"Alley Cat" (Bent Fabric)
"La Bamba" (Ritchie Valens)
"Put Your Little Foot Right There"
"The Loco-Motion" (Little Eva)
"Little Red Caboose" (also used during the end credits along with some instrumental music)
"Peppermint Twist" (Joey Dee and the Starliters)
"Rock Around the Clock" (Bill Haley and his Comets)
"Paw Paw Patch"

Let's Put on a Show! (1995)
Featuring these music videos:
"We'll Put on a Show" (Michael Lloyd) (tune: "Red River Valley") (also used during the end credits)
"Personality" (Lloyd Price)
"It's Magic" (Michael Lloyd) 
"Blue Suede Shoes" (Elvis Presley)
"Mr. Bass Man" (Johnny Cymbal)
"By the Light of the Silvery Moon" (Gus Edwards)
"Me and My Shadow" (Peggy Lee)
"The Best Dog in the World" (Michael Lloyd)
"It's Time for the Show" (Michael Lloyd)
"Give My Regards to Broadway" (George M. Cohan)

Baby Animal Songs (1995)
Featuring these music videos:
"The Petting Zoo" (Michael Lloyd) (tune: "Down on Grandpa's Farm") (also used during the end credits)
"Woolly Bully" (Sam the Sham and the Pharaohs)
"'A' You're Adorable" (Perry Como and The Fontane Sisters)
"Jeepers Creepers"
"Yes! We Have No Bananas" (Louis Prima)
"Side by Side" (Kay Starr)
"Oh, You Beautiful Doll" (Al Jolson)
"Five Little Ducks"
"Does Your Chewing Gum Lose Its Flavour (On the Bedpost Overnight?)" (Lonnie Donegan)
"The Way You Walk" (Michael Lloyd)

I Can Dance! (1997)
Featuring these music videos:
"I Can Dance!" (Michael Lloyd) (also used during the end credits)
"Dancing in the Street" (Martha and the Vandellas)
"Charleston" (James P. Johnson)
"Don't You Just Love to Waltz?" (Michael Lloyd) (tune: "My Bonnie Lies Over the Ocean")
"Twist and Shout" (The Beatles)
"Mexican Hat Dance"
"The Yellow Rose of Texas"
"Come on and Conga" (Michael Lloyd)
"Barefootin'" (Robert Parker)
"Mashed Potato Time" (Dee Dee Sharp)
"At the Hop" (Danny and the Juniors)

I Can Do It! (1997)
Featuring these music videos:
"I Can Do It!" (Michael Lloyd) (also used during the end credits)
"Look What I Can Do" (Michael Lloyd)
"How Does Your Garden Grow?"
"All Shook Up" (Elvis Presley)
"C'mon and Swim" (Bobby Freeman)
"Peanut Butter"
"Button Up Your Overcoat" (Helen Kane)
"Bicycle Built for Two"
"In the Good Old Summertime"
"The Boogie Woogie Bugle Boy" (The Andrews Sisters)
"The Best Sandcastle" (Michael Lloyd)

Adventures in Biggleland: Billy's Birthday (1998)
Featuring these music videos:
"Adventures in Biggleland" (Michael Lloyd) (also used during the end credits)
"I'm a Big Boy Now" (Michael Lloyd)
"Playmate"
"Pat-a-Cake"
"Go In and Out the Window"
"Jump-Jump, Turn Around, Start Again" (Michael Lloyd)
"Simon Says"
"Limbo Rock" (Chubby Checker)
"Happy Birthday to You"
"You Can't Sit Down" (The Dovells)

Adventures in Biggleland: Meet the Biggles (1998)
Featuring these music videos:
"Adventures in Biggleland" (Michael Lloyd) (also used during the end credits)
"Consider Yourself" (Oliver!)
"East Side, West Side (The Sidewalks of New York)"
"Alouette"
"Alexander's Ragtime Band"
"Let's Rock it Up" (Michael Lloyd)
"The Muffin Man"
"Harrigan"
"Let's Be Silly" (Michael Lloyd) (tune: "Today is Monday/Everybody Happy")
"Ta-Ra-Ra-Boom-Dee-A"

Television series

The Kidsongs Television Show debuted on September 19, 1987, with 26 half-hour episodes for 30 minutes distributed by Orbis Entertainment. The half-hour, live-action episodes featured the Kidsongs Kids running their own TV show in a top 8 countdown-style show, featuring music videos from the Kidsongs home video series. It ran on network affiliates, primarily on Saturday mornings. It garnered excellent ratings and ran for 2 years, before moving to the Disney Channel and Las Estrellas (Spanish language) for another four years. It won the prestigious Excellence in Children's Programming Award from ACT. In 1987–88, it was called The Kidsongs TV Show.

In 1994, a new version of the television series was developed by Rosenstein and produced in conjunction with Chicago Public television station WTTW for 30 minutes and distributed by American Public Television to PBS stations nationally. Airing as part of the PBS Kids "Ready to Learn" block, The Kidsongs Television Show aired throughout the country and, by 1998, reached 89 percent of households. Many of the original Kidsongs videos were used in the public television series, along with new educational content and in-studio guests. The kids are joined by the fantasy characters Billy and Ruby Biggle and their magical friends from Biggleland. The Biggles help the children resolve their problems and concerns in a comforting, kind way. They address age-appropriate issues, such as not wanting to share, jealousy, friendship, telling the truth and patience.

Seasons one through four of The Kidsongs Television Show totalled 96 episodes. It ran on Public Television for six years, winning critical acclaim. Currently, fifteen episodes of The Kidsongs Television Show are available on DVD, and the series is also available in its entirety on digital download through iTunes and Amazon Video.

Series overview

Season 1 (1987–1988)

Season 2 (1994)

Season 3 (1995)

Season 4 (1997)

References

External links

 Official website
 Kidsongs on Internet Movie Database

Television shows filmed in Illinois
Early childhood education
Child musical groups
1980s American children's television series
1990s American children's television series
1980s American music television series
1990s American music television series
1987 American television series debuts
1997 American television series endings
Orbis Communications
American television shows featuring puppetry
American preschool education television series
1980s preschool education television series
1990s preschool education television series
Television series about children
Television series about size change
American children's musical television series
Television series by WTTW
PBS Kids shows
Television franchises
Television series by Sony Pictures Television
Warner Records artists